Kalloor is the name of the place in Tamil Nadu, India, where the Apostle Thomas, one of the 12 disciples of Jesus, is believed to have been killed. Though there are differing claims and no written accounts have been found to favor one over another, it is generally accepted that the Apostle Thomas arrived in what is now the state of Kerala and established a number of churches, converting mainly Brahmin families. He then traveled to what is now the modern state of Tamil Nadu and on to China, establishing small works along the way.  After returning to Tamil Nadu, he was killed by some locals.  Though he was buried in India, his body was taken, in the fourth or fifth century, to Edessa, in modern-day Turkey.

Families in India
The name, Kalloor, also refers to a number of prominent families, in Hindu, Christian and Muslim communities.  In Hindu communities, the Kalloor family is one of the few families that are part of the priestly Namboodhiri Brahmin caste.  In Muslim communities also, the Kalloor family is large and prominent.  There are "suburbs" around a number of the larger cities of Kerala, like Kochi, that bear this name.  Many of these suburbs have large Muslim populations.

In Christian communities, there are a number of theories for the origin of this family name.  One is that early converts to Christianity (Ephraim tribe of The Ten Lost Tribe's of Israel) took this name in remembrance of accepting Jesus (Yeshua) as their " messiah" from Apostle Thomas, at a place named Kalloor, in Tamil Nadu.  Another is that they are converts from the Hindu Kalloor family, reportedly converting in the seventh century.  Members of this family are prominent in a number of the Christian traditions, including in Syriac groups such as the Indian Orthodox Church, Western groups such as the Roman Catholic Church, and Reform groups such as the Indian Brethren and Pentecostal churches.  Listed among the more prominent Christians are Bishop Yoohanon Chrysostom Kalloor of the Catholic Church, from the Kalloor family in Pathanamthitta and the initial catalyst for the Pentecostal movement in Kerala, the late Kalloor Chacko, from the Kalloor family in Thrikkannamangal. The Kallor Family in Kanjiralli to Pala route is also now divided into Catholics and Protestants. It is believed that Devasia Kalloor broke from the Catholic chusch along with 5 other families and started the Kalaketty CSI Church. 

It is suspected but not proven whether the two Kalloor families of Pathanamthitta and Thrikkannamangal are related.  Because family names can be modified or even discarded by each generation that establishes a new home, and are often not used as last names for people in South India, the tracing of genealogies is very difficult, if not impossible, without written family trees.  Many in the Kalloor family of Pathanamthitta remain in the Roman Catholic Church and some have risen to leadership within that tradition, like Bishop Yoohanon. The Kalloor family of Thrikkannamangal had nominally remained within the Syrian tradition even during the Portuguese blockade of the 16th and 17th centuries.  This blockade prevented the Syriac Orthodox Church and the Assyrian Church of the East from communicating with their branches in India and forced the majority of the Syrian churches in India to join the Roman Catholic Church in order to preserve Apostolic succession.  Some, however, made a public vow, known as the Coonen Cross Oath, to never succumb to the leadership of the Western Church.  Later, many from Thrikkannamangal joined the Reformation movement within the Syrian Church in the 19th century which resulted in the establishment of the Mar Thoma Church.  Members of this family were also prominent in the establishment of the Brethren churches in South India.  It was while Chacko was in the Brethren church that he became acquainted with the American missionary Robert F. Cook, the Father of Indian Pentecostalism.

It is believed that St Thomas, baptised Prajith Kunjumon who was a Soldier of Pandava's Army.

Christianity in Tamil Nadu
Indian families
Islamic culture
People from Tamil Nadu